Ski jumping at the 2022 Winter Olympics was held at the Snow Ruyi hill in Zhangjiakou, China. The events were held between 5 and 14 February 2022.

In July 2018, the International Olympic Committee (IOC) officially added the mixed team event to the Olympic program, increasing the total number of events to 5. A total of 105 quota spots (65 men and 40 women) were distributed to the sport, the same as the 2018 Winter Olympics. A total of five events were contested, three for men, one for women and one mixed. 

On 7 February, Canada won the bronze medal in the mixed team competition, the first ever ski jumping medal for the country at the Winter Olympics.

Qualification

A maximum of 105 athletes (65 male and 40 female) will be allowed to qualify for the ski jumping events. The quotas will be allocated using the Olympic Quota Allocation List, which is calculated using the FIS World Cup, FIS Ski Jumping Grand Prix and Continental Cup Standings from seasons 2020–21 and 2021–22 added together.

Competition schedule
The following was the competition schedule for the four ski jumping events.

All times are (UTC+8).

Medal summary

Medal table

Medalists

Participating nations
A total of 110 athletes (70 men and 40 women) from 22 nations (including the IOC's designation of ROC for the Russian Olympic Committee) qualified to participate.

The numbers in parenthesis represents the number of participants entered.

References

External links
Official Results Book – Ski Jumping

Ski jumping at the 2022 Winter Olympics
2022
Ski jumping
Winter Olympics